Sarah Coventry jewelry was named after the granddaughter of Lyman K. Stuart, the founder of the company.  Established in 1949, thousands of women and some men were recruited to sell jewelry at Sarah Coventry home jewelry parties. It is recognized as the oldest direct selling jewelry company in the world. They did not design their own jewelry but used other manufacturers to produce it. Most of the production happened in the state of Rhode Island.

In the mid-1980s a subsidiary of Playboy Enterprises. Inc (the publishers of Playboy magazine) owned the company, as it was planning on diversifying into a brand management company. It later sold the company in the 1990s.  However, Sarah Coventry jewelry was re-opened years later by new owners and was being distributed by representatives via catalogs, the Internet, home shopping networks, and other means.  The company has since gone out of business.

Marks 
Some marks seen on vintage jewelry include:

"SC"
"Sarah Cov."
"Sarah"
"SaC"
"Coventry"

There is usually but not always a copyright symbol accompanying the mark.

References

Further reading 

Jewelry retailers of the United States